Samuel Siegfried Voigt (1885–1937), commonly known as S.S. Voigt, was an architect based in Wichita, Kansas who specialised in churches and school design.  He was reported to have designed about 200 churches and more than 400 schools.

He was born in Leipzig, Germany, and came to Wichita at a young age.  He worked for architect F.G. McCune in Wichita and later established his own firm.  He died unexpectedly after a short illness in 1937.

"Architect S.S. Voigt did not appear to favor a particular style in his school designs but rather embraced the
popular styles of the times. His early school commissions were Progressive Era/Commercial Style buildings of
the 1920s".  He designed several Collegiate Gothic schools, including in 1921, 1928, and 1930. "By the mid-1930s, his
school designs reflected Modern and Art Deco stylistic influences." "Kansas schools known to have been designed by Voigt are located in: Beeler, Caldwell, Chase, Coffey County, Derby, Elmdale, Harper, Lakin, Lorraine, Lost Springs, Leroy, Medicine Lodge, Moran, Piedmont, and Uttica, in addition to the 1931 Belleville High School."

Works include:
St. Paul's African Methodist Episcopal Church (1914), in Wichita
Westside Presbyterian Church (1915), in Wichita
Barnes Building (1919), Wichita
Fourth National Bank Building (1919), Wichita
Salem Evangelical Church (1920), Wichita
Rural High School District No. 2 (1921), in Lost Springs, Kansas.  Collegiate Gothic.
Orpheum Theater (1922), Wichita
Southwestern Osteopathic Sanitarium (1924), Wichita
University Friends Church (1925), Wichita
Midian Shrine Temple (1927), Wichita
Southern Coffey County High School (1928), in LeRoy, Kansas.  Collegiate Gothic.
Hotel Roberts (1930), Pratt, Kansas, NRHP-listed.
Belleville High School (1931)in Belleville, Kansas, NRHP-listed
St. Mary's American Syrian Orthodox Church (1935), Wichita
Stanley African Methodist Episcopal Church (1937), Wichita
Anthony Theater, 220 W. Main St. Anthony, Kansas, NRHP-listed
First Presbyterian Church of Abilene, 300 N. Mulberry St. Abilene, Kansas, NRHP-listed
Wolf Hotel, 104 E. Santa Fe Ellinwood, Kansas, NRHP-listed
Eureka Memorial Hall (1924), Eureka, Kansas,

Notes

References

German emigrants to the United States
People from Wichita, Kansas
Architects from Leipzig
Architects from Kansas
1885 births
1937 deaths